Brian mac Maelruanaidh (died 1003) was King of Maigh Seóla.

Biography

All that is known for certain of Brian is contained in his obit, dated 1003:

Brian, son of Maelruanaidh, lord of West Connaught, was slain by his own people

In that year, "the Ui-Fiachrach Aidhne aided by West Connaught fought a battle against the Uí Maine" and "the men of West Meath ... wherein fell Gillaceallaigh, son of Comhaltan Ua Cleirigh, lord of Ui-Fiachrach; Conchobhar, son of Ubban; Ceannfaeladh, son of Ruaidhri, and many others. Finn, son of Marcan, Tanist of Ui-Maine, fell in the heat of the conflict." 

It is not known if this conflict had any role in Brian's assassination. Both the Muintir Murchada and Uí Fiachrach Aidhne were allied with Brian Boru, who was the son of a daughter of Urchadh mac Murchadh.

References

 West or H-Iar Connaught Ruaidhrí Ó Flaithbheartaigh, 1684 (published 1846, ed. James Hardiman).
 Origin of the Surname O'Flaherty, Anthony Matthews, Dublin, 1968, p. 40.
 Irish Kings and High-Kings, Francis John Byrne (2001), Dublin: Four Courts Press, 
 Annals of Ulster at CELT: Corpus of Electronic Texts at University College Cork
 Byrne, Francis John (2001), Irish Kings and High-Kings, Dublin: Four Courts Press, 

People from County Galway
1003 deaths
10th-century Irish monarchs
11th-century Irish monarchs
Year of birth unknown